Defense in depth is a concept used in information security in which multiple layers of security controls (defense) are placed throughout an information technology (IT) system. Its intent is to provide redundancy in the event a security control fails or a vulnerability is exploited that can cover aspects of personnel, procedural, technical and physical security for the duration of the system's life cycle.

Background 
The idea behind the defense in depth approach is to defend a system against any particular attack using several independent methods. It is a layering tactic, conceived by the National Security Agency (NSA) as a comprehensive approach to information and electronic security. The term defense in depth in computing is inspired by a military strategy of the same name, but is quite different in concept. The military strategy revolves around having a weaker perimeter defense and intentionally yielding space to buy time, envelop, and ultimately counter-attack an opponent, whereas the information security strategy simply involves multiple layers of controls, but not intentionally ceding ground (cf. honeypot.)

Controls 
Defense in depth can be divided into three areas: Physical, Technical, and Administrative.

Physical 
Physical controls are anything that physically limits or prevents access to IT systems. Fences, guards, dogs, and CCTV systems and the like.

Technical 
Technical controls are hardware or software whose purpose is to protect systems and resources. Examples of technical controls would be disk encryption, File integrity software, and authentication. Hardware technical controls differ from physical controls in that they prevent access to the contents of a system, but not the physical systems themselves.

Administrative 
Administrative controls are organization's policies and procedures. Their purpose is to ensure that there is proper guidance available in regard to security and that regulations are met. They include things such as hiring practices, data handling procedures, and security requirements.

Methods 
Using more than one of the following layers constitutes an example of defense in depth.

System and application 

 Antivirus software
 Authentication and password security
 Encryption
 Hashing passwords
 Logging and auditing
 Multi-factor authentication
 Vulnerability scanners
 Timed access control
 Internet Security Awareness Training
 Sandboxing
 Intrusion detection systems (IDS)

Network 

 Firewalls (hardware or software)
 Demilitarized zones (DMZ)
 Virtual private network (VPN)

Physical 

 Biometrics
 Data-centric security
 Physical security (e.g. deadbolt locks)

Example 

In the following scenario a web browser is developed using defense in depth -

 the browser developers receive security training
 the codebase is checked automatically using security analysis tools
 the browser is regularly audited by an internal security team
 ... is occasionally audited by an external security team
 ... is executed inside a sandbox

See also
Defence-in-depth (Roman military)
Defense strategy (computing)

References

Computer network security
Computer security procedures
Data security

fr:Défense en profondeur